Borophryne apogon, the netdevil, or greedy seadevil, is a species of leftvent anglerfish known today from the waters of the eastern Pacific Ocean off the Central American coast. This species grows to a length of  TL. A fossil specimen of this species has been found in the Los Angeles Basin dating back to the Late Miocene, some eight million years ago.

Description
The depth of the head is between 50% and 65% of the fish's standard length and the length of the head is between 50% and 60% of the standard length, with the lower jaw being four fifths of the length of the head. Three rows of long, sharp teeth line the jaws and there are up to four teeth on the roof of the mouth. The illicium on the snout is short and the esca on its tip is large with a branching terminal appendage and filaments on the side. There is a rounded protuberance on the forehead, the sphenotic spines (above the eyes) are large in young specimens but become overgrown with skin in older ones, and there is a symphysial spine at the tip of the jaw. The caudal peduncle is particularly short. The head and body are dark reddish-brown, or completely black, and the fins are usually colorless. The dorsal fin and the anal fin both have three soft rays, while the pectoral fins have fifteen to eighteen rays each, and the caudal fin has nine. This anglerfish is similar in appearance to Linophryne, but lacks the barbel on the chin.

It differs from other leftvent anglerfish in having no premaxillae and having large sphenotic spines. The jaws bear no teeth, but there are up to six or seven strong, short placoid scales above and below the mouth which meet when the jaws are closed. The olfactory organs are large and unpigmented, but the rest of the head and body is lightly pigmented and pale brown.

Distribution
This species is found only in the tropical eastern Pacific.

Evolution
A fossil of Borophryne apogon and one of the closely related headlight angler (Linophryne indica) were found in Late Miocene laminated deposits in the eastern sector of the Los Angeles Basin, California, during construction of a metro line subway station in Los Angeles. The assemblage of anglerfish included several other extant species of anglerfish.

Biology
When a free-living male B. apogon encounters a female he latches onto her belly with his mouth and their tissues gradually fuse, with the male becoming parasitic.

References

Linophrynidae
Taxa named by Charles Tate Regan
Fish described in 1925